Adrian Zermeño (born 1 May 1979) is a Mexican professional footballer. He currently plays for the leaders of the 2009 Mexican ascent League the Club Tijuana as a goalkeeper, he was drafted finally from the Tigres UANL on the 2009 ascent Draft.

Honours
Tijuana
Liga MX: Apertura 2012

External links
 

1979 births
Living people
Mexican people of Spanish descent
Footballers from Guadalajara, Jalisco
Cruz Azul footballers
Chiapas F.C. footballers
Querétaro F.C. footballers
San Luis F.C. players
Tigres UANL footballers
Club Tijuana footballers
Association football goalkeepers
Mexican footballers